The Associação Paulista de Críticos de Arte (São Paulo Association of Art Critics) or APCA (established 1956) is an organization based in São Paulo, Brazil which honors the best in the Brazilian fields of stage acting (since 1956), music, literature, film, television, plastic arts (since 1972/1973), and radio (since 1980).

See also 
 APCA Award for Best Film

References

External links

APCA at the Internet Movie Database

Brazilian awards
Brazilian literary awards
Awards established in 1956
Arts organisations based in Brazil
1956 establishments in Brazil